A Slav is a person of Slavic ethnicity.

'Slav 'may also refer to:

 Slav Defense, a chess opening
 Semi-Slav Defense, a distinctive chess opening
 Slav (settlement), a former Israeli settlement in the Gaza Strip
 Birdwatcher's jargon for horned grebe (or Slavonian grebe), a waterbird
 SLĀV, a controversial 2018 Canadian theatrical production

See also
 Slavic (disambiguation)
 Slave (disambiguation)